One Nevada Credit Union, headquartered in Winchester, Nevada, is the largest locally based federally insured, state-chartered credit union in Nevada with locations in Las Vegas, Henderson, Reno, and North Las Vegas.

Membership
One Nevada has a community charter, meaning membership is available to anyone who lives, works (or regularly conducts business in), worships, attends school, or volunteers in Clark County, Washoe County, Nye County, along with members of the immediate family or household of an existing member or those eligible for membership.

Financial performance
As of November 30, 2022, One Nevada had 15 branch locations, 400 surcharge-free ATMs in Nevada alone and 46,000 ATMs nationwide as part of the Allpoint Network, 75,465 members, and $1.3 billion in total assets. It is classified as a well-capitalized credit union by the National Credit Union Administration and its deposits are insured for up to $250,000 through the National Credit Union Share Insurance Fund.  One Nevada remains one of the strongest credit unions or banks in the state with more than 11% in capital reserves.

History
One Nevada has its beginnings in two separate credit unions that merged many years later. The Vegas Air Base Federal Credit Union was started on February 10, 1950, when nine civilian employees pooled $5 each to begin their credit union. The credit union changed its name to Nellis Federal Credit Union in 1958.

Meanwhile, at Las Vegas City Hall, seven City employees began the Las Vegas City Employees Federal Credit Union on February 14, 1951. For the next 30 years or so, both credit unions served the employees of their respective employers and their families. Both credit unions grew and expanded their services.

On August 31, 1983, the Nellis Southern Nevada Federal Credit Union and the Las Vegas Federal Credit Union merged and adopted the name Nevada Federal Credit Union.

During the 1980s, several smaller credit unions joined with Nevada Federal. Those smaller credit unions include the Showboat Credit Union, the Commercial Center Credit Union, the Nevada Air Guard Credit Union, the Washoe State Employees Federal Credit Union, the North Las Vegas City Employees Federal Credit Union, the Vegas Village Credit Union, the Tropicana Employees Federal Credit Union and others.

In August 2011, the members of Nevada Federal Credit Union approved the conversion from a federal charter to a Nevada state-charter. The credit union changed its name to One Nevada Credit Union shortly thereafter.

Timeline

Products and services
In addition to traditional banking products and services such as share savings, share certificates, share drafts (checking), mortgage loans, auto loans, and credit cards, the credit union offers various non-traditional products. These include first-time home buyer program and Essential Checking accounts for member-households who earn less than $35,000 annually or have recently had a job loss. As of March 2010, the credit union had also launched a suite of prepaid debit card products.

One Nevada Credit Union is consistently among the largest mortgage lenders in Clark County, Nevada. The credit union recently participated in Nevada's Hardest Hit Fund and the HARP 2.0 mortgage assistance programs.

Not-for-profit structure
One Nevada, like many U.S. credit unions, is locally controlled by a volunteer Board of Directors who represent the members interests. Unlike a traditional bank owned by public stockholders, a member election for the Board of Directors is held once a year. Any member in good standing can petition to run for the Board of Directors. Board volunteers are not paid for their time or service. The Board also appoints a volunteer Supervisory Committee. The Credit Union's income, aside from operating expenses and funding capitalization, are returned to the members in the form of lower loan rates, expanded services and normally, higher dividends on deposit accounts. Therefore, the credit union, like all others in the U.S., maintains a federal tax-exempt status because of the cooperative, not-for-profit organizational structure.

References

External links 
Official Site

Credit unions based in Nevada
Companies based in Winchester, Nevada
Microfinance
Banks established in 1950